The Jarasum International Jazz Festival is an annual Jazz Festival in South Korea. The festival began in 2004 with 30 teams of jazz artists from 12 countries. Well established as a significant international festival, every year, over 100,000 people visit this particularly popular festival and 95% of the attendees are actually previous visitors. In 2014, the festival ran from Friday, October 3 to Sunday, October 5.  Jarasum (which means "terrapin island" in Korean) is located in the center of the Korean peninsula. 

The main lineup for 2014 included Maceo Parker, Paquito D’Rivera and Trio Corrente, The Yellowjackets, Allan Holdsworth, Terje Rypdal and Ketil Bjørnstad, Joachim Kühn, Dominic Miller, Mathias Eick, Tord Gustavsen, Jan Lundgren, Gregoire Maret and Jazz Connection.

See also 
List of music festivals in South Korea 
List of jazz festivals

Notes

Music festivals in South Korea
Music festivals established in 2004
Jazz festivals in South Korea 
Annual events in South Korea
Autumn events in South Korea